Cleopatra Records is an American independent record label based in Los Angeles, California. It was founded in 1992 by Brian Perera. The record label has since grown into a family of labels, including Hypnotic Records, Purple Pyramid Records, Deadline Music Records, and X-Ray Records, encompassing a variety of genres with emphasis on unique and experimental artists.

History and notable artists
Cleopatra Records has been primarily known for ushering in the second wave of gothic and industrial music with an eclectic roster of artists, including Christian Death, Nosferatu, Rosetta Stone, Switchblade Symphony, Leæther Strip, Birmingham 6, The Electric Hellfire Club, Razed in Black, X Marks the Pedwalk, Spahn Ranch, Genitorturers, Download (featuring members of Skinny Puppy), Pagandom and others, as well as new wave artists Gary Numan, Missing Persons, Information Society and others.

Cleopatra has also been a vital force in promoting underground and British punk rock bands such as The Vibrators, U.K. Subs, and The Damned, as well as dozens of lesser known bands that had never before been released in the U.S. market.

When the revival of 1980s Hollywood Metal exploded around the turn of the century, the company started a subsidiary label Deadline Music to handle releases by Quiet Riot, White Lion, Warrant, Cinderella, Poison’s Bret Michaels and L.A. Guns.

Partnering with European labels such as Lifted Music and Hard Records, Cleopatra established the Hypnotic imprint for a series of electronic music compilations as well as full-length albums by The Future Sound of London, Paul Oakenfold, Superstar DJ Keoki, and Talla 2XLC as well as the first ever feature-length documentary on rave culture: Better Living Through Circuitry. Most recently, Hypnotic has been the home of high profile, and highly prolific, metal-turned-electronic music act Blackburner.

Hip hop acts have also found a home at Cleopatra Records on the X-Ray imprint, which has released albums by SX-10 (featuring Sen Dog of Cypress Hill), KRS-One, Brokencyde, Westside Connection, and DMX. X-Ray Records achieved a first for the Cleopatra family in 2005 when the album It's Not A Game by Bone Thugs-n-Harmony member Layzie Bone landed on the Billboard Top 100 chart.

The Purple Pyramid imprint, focusing on progressive rock and psychedelic music has produced releases by Yes, Rick Wakeman, Steve Howe, Santana, Amon Düül II, Nektar, Brainticket, Tangerine Dream, and Quicksilver Messenger Service as well as projects by producer/musician Billy Sherwood dubbed The Prog Collective, (featuring members of Asia, King Crimson, Mahavishnu Orchestra, and Gong), and The Fusion Syndicate (featuring Rick Wakeman, Steve Stevens, Billy Cobham, and Steve Morse). In 2011, the label partnered with prog rock band Nektar for a 2CD collection called Retrospektive, followed by the covers album Spoonful Of Time in 2012 and the new album, Time Machine, in 2013 alongside reissues of the band's older albums.

Recent activity
The Cleopatra label group has expanded in a variety of directions, working with iconic artists such as Sly Stone and William Shatner. R&B singer-songwriter and guitar hero Shuggie Otis released a live concert DVD, CD & LP Live In Williamsburg through Cleopatra in 2014, as well as the 2018 instrumental studio album Inter-Fusion featuring drummer Carmine Appice and bassist Tony Franklin.

Judy Collins released a duets album in 2015 via Cleopatra called Strangers Again featuring Willie Nelson, Jackson Browne, Jeff Bridges, Glen Hansard (of The Swell Season), Jimmy Buffett, Michael McDonald, and Don McLean as well as 2016's Silver Skies Blue album, which earned her a Grammy nomination for Best Folk Album, plus 2017's critically acclaimed Everybody Knows album with Stephen Stills.

The label has also become home to producer/songwriter Todd Rundgren, starting in 2016 with a 3-CD box set of unreleased vintage live material called Box O’ Todd and a new concert CD/DVD called An Evening with Todd Rundgren Live at the Ridgefield. That was followed by Todd's newest studio album White Knight, released in 2017 and featuring a host of guest appearances by artists including Trent Reznor, Robyn, Dâm-Funk, Daryl Hall, Donald Fagen, Joe Walsh, Joe Satriani and more.

Cleopatra has released high-profile live and studio albums by some of the biggest country artists in music including The Oak Ridge Boys, T. G. Sheppard, Collin Raye, Sammy Kershaw, Little Texas, Doug Kershaw, and a quickly ascending newcomer Mary Sarah. The company also established a blues imprint, Cleopatra Blues, that produced releases by Junior Wells, Kenny Neal (whose Cleopatra Blues album Bloodline was nominated for a Grammy for Best Contemporary Blues Album), Arthur Adams, Big Jay McNeely, Popa Chubby, Eric Gales, Leo Welch and others.

Cleopatra remains a strong champion of avant garde, underground music such as psychedelic groove band Brainticket who re-released their catalog through Cleopatra, and was even brought over for their first US tour in 2011. A new Brainticket album titled Past, Present and Future was released in 2015. San Francisco noise-art band Chrome also saw Cleopatra release numerous reissues of the band's late ‘70s and early ‘80s output on both vinyl and CD over the last few years, culminating in the massive 7 LP vinyl box set, a reissue and expanded version of the historic Chrome Box. Amon Düül II, one of the most influential German experimental bands of all-time, partnered with Cleopatra in 2014 for a series of deluxe, limited edition vinyl reissues of such albums as Yeti, Phallus Dei, Wolf City, and others, along with the group's newest effort Düülirium, released in June 2014.

Cleopatra owner Brian Perera has also been well known as a longtime champion of Hawkwind. Cleopatra released the final album by original Hawkwind guitarist Huw Lloyd-Langton, a 2-CD collection of rare tracks and new recordings, before his passing in late 2012. And reviving a relationship that first began in the mid ‘90s with the release of several of his solo albums, the label is once again working Hawkwind alum Nik Turner. Turner's newest solo efforts, the most critically acclaimed of his career, were released through Cleopatra including 2013's Space Gypsy and 2015's Space Fusion Odyssey. Both albums were supported with U.S. tours alongside neo-Krautrock band Hedersleben (featuring Nicky Garratt of UK Subs) whose catalog was also recently picked up by Cleopatra. 2015 also saw publication of The Spirit Of Hawkwind 1969–1976, Turner's definitive account of his years in Hawkwind told through the words of music journalist Dave Thompson as well as numerous rare and unpublished photos.

Expanding its interest in punk, Cleopatra acquired the entire catalog of releases by esteemed San Francisco Bay Area punk label, New Red Archives, formerly owned by Nicky Garratt. The label was home to the debut album of politically charged punk band Anti-Flag, early ‘80s NY-based hardcore groups Kraut, and Reagan Youth, as well as an early project from Sunny Day Real Estate / Foo Fighters bassist Nate Mendel called Christ on a Crutch. Recent signings include Slaughter & the Dogs and Anti-Nowhere League, plus hardcore icons The Casualties and Down By Law. That same year, an exclusive licensing deal for the hugely popular Kung Fu Records label brought bands such as The Vandals, The Ataris, Tsunami Bomb, and more into the Cleopatra family.

In a nod to their gothic-industrial roots, the label acquired the complete Wax Trax! recordings of Ministry mastermind Al Jourgensen, including several unreleased Ministry songs as well as albums by Revolting Cocks, 1000 Homo DJs, PTP, Pailhead (with Ian MacKaye), and Acid Horse. This culminated in the release of the Ministry Trax! Box, a 7 CD plus bonus LP compendium of 101 tracks from the 1980-1985 period including 29 previously unreleased recordings all packaged in a patent leather, foil-stamped box with a 64-page book. The label also published a massive tome of unreleased photos and ephemera of Bauhaus, entitled Bauhaus Undead, curated by founding member Kevin Haskins. That led to a record deal for Haskins’ project with Daniel Ash, Poptone, featuring newly recorded versions of songs by Bauhaus, Tones on Tail, and Love & Rockets.

2017 & 2018 saw the label partner with a number of underground and indie artists such as The Warlocks, Bestial Mouths, Magic Wands, Fantome (featuring Hanin Elias of Atari Teenage Riot), Gary Wilson, Egrets On Ergot, Descartes A Kant, Pastel Ghost, United Ghosts, Holygram, Whispering Sons as well as more familiar acts such as The Guess Who, Tom Keifer (of Cinderella), and Gin Blossoms plus live albums from Jane's Addiction, Culture Club and Sheryl Crow.

Also in 2018, the label staged another major foray into the world of hip hop through the imprint X-Ray Records with releases by Gunplay, Riff Raff, Onyx, Luniz, Black Sheep, Brokencyde, Petey Pablo, and R&B icon Case. The year culminated in one of the imprint's highest profile releases ever, the new studio album from Wu-Tang Clan member Ghostface Killah, The Lost Tapes, and two remix albums released simultaneously as The Ghost Files.

Now Glenn Danzig — who recently unveiled his debut horror film, Verotika — has devoted an entire album to hailing the King. The long-in-the-works Danzig Sings Elvis, released April 24, 2020, features Evil Elvis’ covers of iconic Presley numbers like “Always on My Mind,” “Baby, Let’s Play House,” and even the distinctly un-Danzig-like “Pocket Full of Rainbows.” What’s most surprising is how faithful his versions are to the originals.

His take on "One Night" — Presley’s foot-stomping rockabilly barnburner, which made it up to number 4 in 1957 — retains all the lustful passion of the original with gently buzzing guitar and as much glorious slap-back reverb as Danzig could find.

A teaser for Powerman 5000's new single, "Black Lipstick", is available. The track is taken from the band's upcoming album, The Noble Rot, due later in the year via Cleopatra Records.

When Powerman 5000's new deal with Cleopatra Records was first announced, vocalist Spider One said: "We are incredibly excited to partner with Cleopatra Records for our latest release, 'The Noble Rot'. We feel like we have put together our most diverse and interesting record ever. All boxes have been checked in the strange universe that is Powerman 5000 with this one, and we can't wait for everyone to hear it."

Brian Perera, owner of Cleopatra Records, added: "We've been fans of Powerman 5000 for years, watching how they have stuck to their guns throughout their career and maintained a high level of creative ambition and risk. They are a rare breed of electronic/industrial metal bands who have crossed over and gained fans from multiple genres. This new album is really going to shock the world and we are honoured to be releasing it."

Acquisitions
New Red Archives
In 2012, Cleopatra acquired the entire catalog of releases by New Red Archives, formerly owned by Nicky Garratt of UK Subs. The label was home to first wave punk group U.K. Subs, the debut album of political punk group Anti-Flag, early 1980s New York hardcore groups Reagan Youth and Kraut the first independent group ever in rotation on MTV , as well as an early project from Sunny Day Real Estate / Foo Fighters bassist Nate Mendel called Christ On A Crutch, and hardcore punk legends Hogan's Heroes.

Wax Trax!
The label acquired the complete Wax Trax! recordings of Al Jourgensen, including several unreleased Ministry songs as well as albums by Revolting Cocks, 1000 Homo DJs, PTP, Pailhead (with Ian MacKaye), and Acid Horse. A 7-CD box set of these recordings (entitled Trax! Box) was released in April 2015. Meanwhile, Cleopatra has continued to work with established artists such as Missing Persons’ Dale Bozzio, Thor, The Oak Ridge Boys, Shuggie Otis, and Popa Chubby and Eric Gales.

Cleopatra Blues
When Los Angeles-based independent record label Cleopatra Records, Inc. began attracting talent from modern blues artists and purchased the estate of Junior Wells, the company decided to create a label dedicated to the genre. Cleopatra Blues was established in 2015, using a logo based on a well-known photo of Junior Wells smoking a cigarette.

The label has become a home for modern blues acts as Popa Chubby, Eric Gales, James Montgomery, Leo Welch, and Lance Lopez, as well as up-and-coming blues artists such as Eli Cook and British prodigy Tom Killner.

Louisiana blues artist Kenny Neal raised the profile of the label considerably with the release of his solo album, 2016's Bloodline, which was nominated for a Grammy Nominees (Grammy Nominees#2016) in the category of Grammy Award for Best Contemporary Blues Album.

Saxophone player Big Jay McNeely joined the label in 2016 for his release Blowin’ Down The House - Big Jay's Latest & Greatest and will also be releasing a live CD & DVD called Honkin’ & Jivin’ At The Palomino in 2017.

A box set featuring unreleased tracks the label acquired in its purchasing of the Junior Wells estate is set to be released in 2017.

Soulful blues phenom, and Blues Hall Of Fame inductee, Joe Louis Walker is joined by a host of talented friends and peers on his superb new studio album.

Features guest performances by fellow blues icons Keb' Mo', Eric Gales, and Albert Lee plus Detroit soul singer Mitch Ryder, harmonica virtuoso Lee Oskar, Hot Tuna's Jorma Kaukonen, punk rock vocalist Charlie Harper, Waddy Wachtel, and many more.

This album explodes with the passionate playing and soulful melodies that have made Walker a favorite among true blues aficionados including The Rolling Stones.

Word has already begun to spread all over the world that Blues royal, Shirley King, daughter of B.B. King, is about to release a new album that features an amazing cast of blues musicians. Anticipation for Blues For A King, the forthcoming album, is riding high, and now eager fans are about to get their first taste of what’s to come with the release of “I Did You Wrong.” One of the album’s smokin’ hot original tunes, “I Did You Wrong” features none other than Rock Hall Of Famer, Blues Hall Of Famer and founding member of the iconic Paul Butterfield Blues Band, Elvin Bishop! Together, Bishop and King create a quintessential blues ballad, kicking off with Bishop's ultra sleek guitar that blends perfectly into King’s powerful vocals.

The song is a highlight on King's new album, Blues For A King, which crosses musical genres from blues to rock to soul and back again. Even next to such high wattage guests as Joe Louis Walker, Robben Ford, Junior Wells, Pat Travers & Elvin Bishop, King absolutely shines as she performs spectacular version of the blues classics “Gallows Pole” and “Hoodoo Blues Man” as well as the soul hit “Johnny Porter” (originally by The Temptations) plus two songs by British rock band Traffic, “Can’t Find My Way Home” and “Feelin’ Alright?.” The album closes with a powerful version of Etta James's unforgettable "At Last," which signals that, at long last, Shirley King is finally getting the attention and recognition she so richly deserves.

X-Ray Records 
X-Ray Records is an imprint under the Cleopatra Records, Inc. label group that focuses on hip hop and modern R&B. The imprint began in 2000 just as the label was starting to diversify after predominantly focusing on gothic and industrial music throughout the late 1990s. It made a start with SX-10, the hip hop/metal hybrid featuring Sen Dog of Cypress Hill. Releases from KRS-One, Mellow Man Ace, Gravediggaz, Junior M.A.F.I.A. and Westside Connection followed.

The imprint achieved a first for the Cleopatra family in 2005 when the album It's Not a Game by Bone Thugs-n-Harmony member Layzie Bone landed on the Billboard Top 100 chart. That attracted more talent to the roster including notorious hip hop outlaw DMX, P. Diddy prodigy Loon, Pastor Troy, Coolio, Afroman, and Vanilla Ice.

In 2018, X-Ray Records staged another major foray into the world of hip hop with releases by Gunplay, Riff Raff, Onyx, Luniz, Black Sheep, Petey Pablo, Lil Reese, Ca$his and R&B icon Case. The year culminated in one of the imprint's highest-profile releases ever, the new studio album from Wu-Tang Clan member Ghostface Killah, The Lost Tapes, and two remix albums released simultaneously as The Ghost Files.

In addition to well-established artists, the label has begun to partner with new and up-and-coming acts such as Reggie Mills, Goest Ryder Young Syrup, ITSOKTOCRY, Angela Mazzanti, as well as several artists from Chief Keef’s Glo Gang roster including Lil Flash, Ballout and others.

Cleopatra Entertainment 
Cleopatra Entertainment is the film division of Cleopatra Records. Beginning in 2015, the company has distributed, developed, and produced several films most of which have a strong horror and/or music component. The company has focused primarily on the home video market through partnerships with NY-based film distributor The Orchard as well as AMPED Music Distribution, and MVD Entertainment Group. However, recent projects have shown that the company is capable of theatrical distribution as well.

Cleopatra Entertainment officially began in 2015 with the U.S. release of the documentary/concert film about German heavy metal band Scorpions called Forever And A Day. This was followed in August of the same year by the company's first major production, Alleluia! The Devil's Carnival, the second installment of the cult horror musical franchise from director Darren Lynn Bousman (director of several installments in the Saw  ) and writer Terrance Zdunich (of Repo! The Genetic Opera ). In addition to financing the film, Cleopatra produced the Blu-ray and DVD releases and also released the official CD soundtrack, which included all of the musical numbers from the film featuring likes of Paul Sorvino, Barry Bostwick, David Hasselhoff, Ted Neeley, rap icon Tech N9ne, Emilie Autumn, Adam Pascal, Butcher Babies, Nivek Ogre, and more!

In 2016, Cleopatra Entertainment released its second music documentary to the home video market, this one about UK punk band The Damned, called Don’t You Wish That We Were Dead, which premiered a year earlier at the SXSW Film Festival.

Cleopatra Entertainment also purchased the vampire thriller Blood Trap, starring Gianni Capaldi , Costas Mandylor, and Vinnie Jones, and released it to the home video market in October of that year. Also in October 2016, Cleopatra brought the twisted romantic comedy StalkHer starring Australia's John Jarratt (of Wolf Creek) and Kaarin Fairfax, to US audiences. Finally, the company will also see a theatrical release for the heartwarming, real-life story of a man and his cat, A Street Cat Named Bob, based on the best-selling book of the same name by James Bowen.

Coming productions for the company include more thrillers such as The Devil's Domain (starring Michael Madsen), The Black Room (starring Lin Shaye), and The 27 Club (based on the "27 Club"). 2017 will also bring dramatic offerings including, Steven, the biopic of Smith's frontman Morrissey and, "Street Survivors", the true story of the 1977 plane crash that forever changed southern rock band Lynyrd Skynyrd, co-written by Skynyrd drummer Artimus Pyle, one of the few members who survived the plane crash.

See also
 List of record labels
 List of electronic music record labels

References

External links
 Official website
 Allrecordlabels.com
 Cleopatra Records Bandcamp page
 

Electronic music record labels
American independent record labels
Record labels established in 1992
Goth record labels
Industrial record labels
Heavy metal record labels